White Lake or Whitelake may refer to:

Populated places

Canada
 White Lake, Ontario

United States
 White Lake, Oneida County, New York
 White Lake, Sullivan County, New York
 White Lake, North Carolina
 White Lake, South Dakota
 White Lake, Wisconsin
 White Lake Township, Michigan

Lakes

Canada
White Lake Provincial Park, British Columbia
White Lake Provincial Park (Ontario)
White Lake (Ontario)

Hungary
 Lake Fehér (disambiguation)

Ireland
White Lough (Monaghan), also known as White Lake

Poland
 Białe Jezioro (disambiguation) ("White Lake"), 17 lakes in Poland
 Jezioro Białe (disambiguation) ("White Lake"), 13 lakes in Poland

United States
White Lake (Oneida County, New York)
White Lake (Michigan), the name of several lakes in Michigan, including:
White Lake (White Lake Township, Michigan)
White Lake State Park in Tamworth, New Hampshire
Lake White State Park in Pike County, Ohio

Other
White Lake (film), a 1989 documentary film by Colin Browne
Whitelake (album), by Enter the Haggis
White Lake Mountain in New York
Whitelake River, Somerset Levels, England

See also 
Lac Blanc (disambiguation) ("White Lake"), several in France
Lago Bianco ("White Lake"), Grisons, Switzerland
Lake Beloye (disambiguation) ("White Lake"), several in Russia
Tsagaannuur (disambiguation) ("White Lake"), several in Mongolia
Weißensee (disambiguation) ("White Lake"), several in Austria, Germany